František Jakub Prokyš (1713–1791) was a Bohemian Rococo painter.

External links

Short Biography and Selected Works

Rococo painters
Czech painters
Czech male painters
1713 births
1791 deaths